The 1907 New York state election was held on November 5, 1907, to elect two judges of the New York Court of Appeals, as well as all members of the New York State Assembly.

History
In 1907, there were only two state officer to be elected statewide: two judges of the Court of Appeals, to succeed Denis O'Brien who had reached the constitutional age limit of 70 years, and Edward T. Bartlett whose fourteen-year term would expire at the end of the year.

The Independence League state convention met on September 28 at Carnegie Hall in New York City. Reuben Robie Lyon was Temporary Chairman. They nominated Reuben Robie Lyon, a lawyer of Bath; and Republican John T. McDonough - a former Secretary of State of New York and justice of the Supreme Court of the Philippines - for the Court of Appeals.

The Republican State Committee met on October 4. Timothy L. Woodruff was Chairman. They re-nominated the incumbent Edward T. Bartlett, and nominated Democrat Willard Bartlett - who occupied an additional seat on the Court of Appeals - to succeed Denis O'Brien. The Democratic State Committee met three hours later. William James Conners was Chairman. They endorsed the Republican nominees, thus effecting a cross endorsement deal without talking with the other party.

Result
The jointly nominated judges were elected.

The incumbent Edward T. Bartlett was re-elected. Willard Bartlett continued on the Court, moving from an additional to a regular seat.

Notes

Sources
Partial result: STEADY DECLINE OF HEARST LEAGUE in NYT on November 7, 1907
Vote totals taken from The New York Red Book 1907
Result: The Tribune Almanac 1908

See also
New York state elections

1907
1907 New York (state) elections